Life in Transition is the second album by The Clint Boon Experience, which is the band formed by Clint Boon in the late nineties. The album cover artwork features a photograph of Clint's son Max Presley Boon, who was 5 years old at the time.

Billboard magazine described the album as "a funky mix of sounds from the radio ready pop of Do What You Do (Earworm Song) to the bossonova style of Me I'm Just A Girl to the chaotic mod sounds of The Frankie Generation."

Track listing

Personnel
Alf Boe - vocals
Clint Boon - engineer, keyboards, mixing, percussion, producer, sampling, vocals
Maegan Boon - vocals
Fran Healy - vocals
Tony Naylor - background vocals
Richard Stubbs - acoustic guitar, bass guitar, background vocals

References

2000 albums
The Clint Boon Experience albums